Martyn William Jarrett SSC  (born 25 October 1944) is a retired Anglican bishop. He was the Bishop of Beverley in the Church of England from 2000 to 2012.

Jarrett was educated at Cotham Grammar School and King's College London (BD, AKC). 

He was ordained in 1968 and began his ordained ministry with a curacy in Bristol followed by one in Swindon. Following this, he held incumbencies in Northolt and then Hillingdon. From 1985 to 1991, he worked for the Advisory Council on Church Ministry and was then vicar of St Mary and All Saints, Chesterfield before his ordination to the episcopate. He was consecrated as a bishop by John Habgood, Archbishop of York, on 2 February 1994 at York Minster and translated to be a provincial episcopal visitor in 2000. He is a keen ornithologist. Before he became the Bishop of Beverley he was the Bishop of Burnley. After he moved in 2000 he was replaced by John Goddard.

It was announced in December 2011 that Jarrett would retire as Bishop of Beverley on 30 September 2012. He was replaced by Glyn Webster as the Bishop of Beverley.

Styles
The Reverend Martyn Jarrett (1970–1994)
The Right Reverend Martyn Jarrett (1994–present)

References

1944 births
Living people
Alumni of King's College London
Associates of King's College London
20th-century Church of England bishops
21st-century Church of England bishops
Bishops of Burnley
Anglican suffragan bishops of Beverley
Anglo-Catholic bishops
English Anglo-Catholics